Boguszyce  is a village in the administrative district of Gmina Rawa Mazowiecka, within Rawa County, Łódź Voivodeship, in central Poland.

There is a very precious wooden church from the 16th century (with polychromes and late Gothic polyptych in the main altar) in the village.

References

Villages in Rawa County